Nebukawa Station accident is a railway accident that occurred in Japan on September 1, 1923.

Overview 
During the Great Kantō earthquake, at three minutes before noon on September 1, 1923, the local train of the Atami-Odawara Line was travelling south towards Manazuru and was stopped at Nebukawa Station. The earthquake caused a mudslide, which covered the station, sweeping the station building, platforms, and train into the ocean, 45 meters down the slope on which the station was built. The Type 960 locomotive and the first 7 cars in the train were submerged, with only the 8th car remaining above water. The train disaster killed 112 people, with an additional 200 people living in the close vicinity of the station also killed by the landslide. The wreck of the train and tracks were salvaged in September 1932 for scrap metal. The Tokyo-bound train on the same line was stopped in the middle of the bridge over the Nebukawa River just before the station, and was overwhelmed by a 35-foot tsunami, which swept the locomotive into the sea, killing six people.

Notes

References 
 Hammer, Joshua. (2006).  Yokohama Burning: The Deadly 1923 Earthquake and Fire that Helped Forge the Path to World War II. New York: Simon & Schuster.   (cloth)
関東大震災における米神・根府川（神奈川県足柄下郡片浦村）の被害総数 - 武村雅之講演要旨 歴史地震 第5号（2010年）124頁。 2012年11月10日閲覧。
山之内秀一郎 『なぜ起こる鉄道事故』東京新聞出版局 
佐々木冨泰・網谷りょういち 『事故の鉄道史 疑問への挑戦』 日本経済評論社 

Railway accidents in 1923
1923 Great Kantō earthquake
Accidents and incidents involving Japanese National Railways